Hovmarken railway halt is a railway halt serving the eastern part of the railway town and suburb of Lystrup north of the city of Aarhus in Jutland, Denmark. The halt is located on the Grenaa railway line between Aarhus and Grenaa. It opened in 1990 as Lystrup East railway halt. Since 2019, the station has been served by the Aarhus light rail system, a tram-train network combining tram lines in the city of Aarhus with operation on railway lines in the surrounding countryside.

See also
 List of railway stations in Denmark
 Rail transport in Denmark

References

External links

 Aarhus Letbane
 Midttrafik

Railway stations in the Central Denmark Region
Railway stations opened in 1990
Railway stations in Denmark opened in the 20th century